Jordan Hayes (born June 14, 1987) is a Canadian actress. She played Dr. Sarah Jordan on Syfy's Helix.

She has also appeared in theatrical films, such as House at the End of the Street, The F Word and Hidden 3D.

In addition, she has directed and written two short films Lay Over (2013) and Ten Speed (2014).

Personal life
Jordan Hayes was born in Montreal and grew up in Aylmer, Quebec.

Her favourite sport was soccer. She even played in the AAA boys league between the ages of 13 and 16.

In college, she originally studied in a "pre-med type program" before transferring to the theatre program.

She had just moved to Los Angeles, California, U.S.A. shortly before she auditioned for Helix. Once she got the role, she moved back to Montreal.

Career
Hayes debuted as an actress in the 2008 short film Dissolved Girl. Though not intentional, a lot of her work has been in the horror and sci-fi genre.

Her guest television appearances include Nikita, Being Erica, Flashpoint, The Firm, Air Emergency and Transporter: The Series.

Her breakout role was Dr. Sarah Jordan on Helix. The television series premiered on Showcase in Canada and Syfy in the U.S., in January, 2014 and ran for two seasons before cancellation.

In 2013, she made a directorial debut with the short film Lay Over, which she also wrote, edited and starred in. The film was made by a group of actors from Canada. She has also directed and written a second short film titled Ten Speed.

In 2016 she has been cast for the USA Network-pilot Poor Richard's Almanack.

Filmography

Actress

Films

Television

Director and screenwriter
 Lay Over (2013, short film)
 Ten Speed (2015, short film)

References

External links
 

1987 births
Living people
21st-century Canadian actresses
Actresses from Montreal
Anglophone Quebec people
Canadian film actresses
Canadian television actresses